Mihai Kokossy (9 April 1911 – 1986) was a Romanian fencer. He competed in the team sabre event at the 1952 Summer Olympics.

References

External links
 

1911 births
1986 deaths
Romanian male fencers
Romanian male sabre fencers
Olympic fencers of Romania
Fencers at the 1952 Summer Olympics